Reuthe is a municipality of the Bregenzerwald, in the westernmost Austrian state of Vorarlberg. It is located in the district of Bregenz. Its main industry is tourism.

Population

Geography 
One of the smallest towns in Vorarlberg, with respect to population and geography, Reuthe has an area of 10.24 km². 53.4% of the community area is forested, 11.6% is alpland.

Culture 
The parish church Hl. Jakobus was built in 1248. In 2002 a new organ was installed.

Reuthe is part of the Bregenzerwald Umgang (literally "Bregenzerwald Walking Tour"). This walking tour offers insights into the architecture and community planning of 12 traditional villages in the Bregenzerwald. While walking over various landscapes, visiting public buildings, homes and everyday objects, walkers gain a comprehensive overview of typical Bregenzerwald architectural styles as they developed throughout the ages.

References

External links
Tiscover.at
Website of the municipality

Cities and towns in Bregenz District